Nicolas Milanovic (born 14 November 2001) is an Australian professional footballer who plays as a midfielder for Western Sydney Wanderers FC.

Career

Sydney United
Milanovic began his football at Sydney United juniors from the age of 4 till 11yrs old ,then moved to Nepean fc for the SAP program.

Western Sydney Wanderers 

Milanovic played his youth career for the wanderers from U14’s to the NPL2.

Western United
Milanovic began his professional career at Western United, joining the club in a COVID-19 pandemic enforced hub in New South Wales in 2020. Milanovic made 36 appearances for Western United before departing the club mid-way through the 2022–23 season, citing his intention to return to his homeland in Sydney.

Western Sydney Wanderers
Within minutes of publicly departing Western United, it was announced that Milanovic had joined Western Sydney Wanderers.

References

External links

2001 births
Living people
Australian soccer players
Association football midfielders
Sydney United 58 FC players
Western Sydney Wanderers FC players
Western United FC players
National Premier Leagues players
A-League Men players
Australian people of Croatian descent